The 2009 Colorado Ice season was the team's third season as a professional indoor football franchise and first in the Indoor Football League (IFL). One of nineteen teams that competed in the IFL in the 2009 season, the Fort Collins-based Colorado Ice were members of the Intense Conference.

Founded in 2007 as part of United Indoor Football, the Colorado Ice became charter members of the IFL when the UIF merged with the Intense Football League before the 2009 season. In their third season under head coach Collins Sanders, the team played their home games at the Budweiser Events Center in Loveland, Colorado.

Schedule
Key:

Regular season
All start times are local time

Standings

 Green indicates clinched playoff berth
 Purple indicates division champion

Postseason

References

External links
Colorado Ice at Loveland Reporter-Herald
Colorado Ice at Fort Collins Coloradoan

Colorado Ice
Colorado Crush (IFL)
Colorado Ice